Miss Pilgrim's Progress is a 1949 black-and-white British comedy film by producer Nat Cohen and director Val Guest.

Plot
Laramie Pilgrim (Yolande Donlan) is an American exchange factory worker who trades places with an upper class British girl. After much adjusting to English country life, and with the various attendant culture clashes, Miss Pilgrim comes to the rescue of her new village and its exploitation by a local land developer.

Cast
Michael Rennie as Bob Thane
Yolande Donlan as Laramie Pilgrim
Garry Marsh as The Mayor	
Emrys Jones as The Vicar
Reginald Beckwith as Mr Jenkins
Helena Pickard as Mrs Jenkins	
Jon Pertwee as Postmaster	
Richard Littledale as Mr Thane
Bruce Belfrage as Factory Manager
Valentine Dyall as Superintendent of Manuscripts
Peter Butterworth as Jonathon
Avril Angers as First Factory Girl

Uncredited:
Ivan Craig as Town Planner
Arthur Hill as American Vice-Consul
Marianne Stone as Second Factory Girl

Critical reception
TV Guide gave the film two out of four stars, and wrote, "the script relies on the surefire technique of cultural differences for humor, with the English countryside providing a pleasant background."

External links 
 

Miss Pilgrim's Progress at New York Times
Miss Pilgrim's Progress at BFI

References

1949 comedy films
1949 films
British comedy films
Films directed by Val Guest
British black-and-white films
Films scored by Ronald Hanmer
1940s English-language films
1940s British films